Elwood Airport  was a public use airport located two nautical miles (3.7 km) south of the central business district of Elwood, in Madison County, Indiana, United States. The airfield closed on September 1, 2008.

Facilities and aircraft 
It has two runways with turf surfaces: 9/27 measures 2,243 by 300 feet (684 x 91 m) and 18/36 is 2,076 by 300 feet (633 x 91 m). For the 12-month period ending August 23, 2005, the airport had 2,604 general aviation aircraft operations, an average of 217 per month.

Airport Restaurant 
The Airport restaurant is still open at the airfield, but holds the (Unofficial) record for the World's First Fly-In Drive In

References

External links 
 

Airports in Indiana
Transportation buildings and structures in Madison County, Indiana
Defunct airports in Indiana